Wayne Wah Kwai Au (born 1972) is an American educational researcher and professor in the School of Educational Studies at the University of Washington Bothell. Since August 1, 2022, he has also been the interim dean of the School of Educational Studies, a position he will hold until June 20, 2024. His research focuses on critical theory and the application of social justice in education.

Education and career
The son of a white mother and a Chinese American father, Au graduated from Garfield High School in Seattle, Washington. He then attended Evergreen State College in Olympia, from which he earned his bachelor's degree in 1994 and his master's degree in 1996, both in teaching. In 2007, he earned his Ph.D. from the University of Wisconsin–Madison. He joined the faculty of the University of Washington Bothell (UWB) in 2010 after teaching at California State University, Fullerton for three years. From 2018 to 2020, he was the interim dean of diversity and equity at UWB.

References

External links
Faculty page

1972 births
Living people
University of Washington Bothell faculty
Evergreen State College alumni
University of Wisconsin–Madison alumni
California State University, Fullerton faculty
American educational theorists
Educational researchers
Critical theorists
American academics of Chinese descent